IV liga Subcarpathia group (grupa podkarpacka) is one of the groups of IV liga, the 5th level of Polish football league system.  The league was created in season 2000/2001 after introducing new administrative division of Poland. Until the end of the 2007/08 season IV liga laid at 4th tier of league system but this was changed with the formation of the Ekstraklasa as the top-level league in Poland. The clubs from Subcarpathian Voivodeship compete in this group. The winner of the league is promoted to III liga, group IV. The bottom teams are relegated to the groups of the regional league from Subcarpathian Voivodeship. These groups are Dębica, Jarosław, Krosno, Rzeszów and Stalowa Wola.

League champions 

Objaśnienia:
 In the 2007/2008 season, Izolator Boguchwała did not advance to the new II liga, the eastern group after losing play-offs.

Season 2000/01 – season 2018/19

Season 2019/20 
Presented the order of places occupied at the end of the season.
The season ended after the matchday 18, no team was relegated from the league.
JKS 1909 Jarosław was punished with a deduction of four points for financial arrears.

Season 2020/21

All-time table 
The table that follows is accurate as of the end of the 2017/18 season. It includes the clubs that played at least one match (even annulled) in IV liga Subcarpathia group.

See also
 Lwów District League, regional league before 1939 (World War II)

References

Football leagues in Poland
Podkarpackie Voivodeship